Archibald Roy Webb (May 2, 1881 – August 27, 1961) was an American football coach.  He served as the sixth head football coach at Baylor University, serving for one season, in 1905, and compiling a record of 1–6. Before coaching at Baylor, Webb attended Brown University, captaining the 1903 Brown Bears football team before graduating in 1905.

Webb was born on May 2, 1881 and lived in Whitehall, Wisconsin for most of his life. He died of a heart attack on August 27, 1961, at the Golden Age Home in Whitehall.

Head coaching record

References

1881 births
1961 deaths
Baylor Bears football coaches
Brown Bears football players
People from Whitehall, Wisconsin
Coaches of American football from Wisconsin
Players of American football from Wisconsin